Sheppard Nunatak is a conical nunatak 60 m high which stands close north of Sheppard Point, the north side of the entrance to Hope Bay, at the northeast end of Antarctic Peninsula. This area was first explored by a party of the Swedish Antarctic Expedition 1901–04. The nunatak was charted in 1945 by the Falkland Islands Dependencies Survey (FIDS), and named by them for its association with Sheppard Point.

Nunataks of Trinity Peninsula